The 2012–13 Latvian Football Cup is the eightieth season of the Latvian annual football knock-out competition.  The winners, FK Ventspils, qualify for the first qualifying round of the 2013–14 UEFA Europa League.

First round
The matches of this round took place between 3 and 13 June 2012.

|}

Second round
Because this season the Latvian Cup had only eight teams in its first round, playing a second one was not necessary, so the first round winners received an automatic bye for the third round, where they will meet First League clubs.

Third round
Entering this round were the 4 teams from the previous round and 8 teams who enter the competition in this round. The matches of this round took place between 30 June and 7 July 2012.

|}

Fourth round
Entering this round were the 6 teams from the previous round and the 10 teams from the Latvian Higher League who enter the competition in this round. These matches took place on 21 and 22 July 2012.

|}

Quarterfinals

Semifinals

Final

References

External links
 LFF.lv

2012–13
2012–13 domestic association football cups
Cup
Cup